Yulga Jinna is a medium-sized Aboriginal community located 130 km north of Meekatharra in the Mid-West region of Western Australia, within the Shire of Meekatharra.

Native title 
The community is located within the fully determined Nharnuwangga (WAD72/98) native title claim area.

Education 
Children of school age at Yulga Jinna attend the Yulga Jinna Remote Community School. The school caters for years K-10.

Governance 
The community is managed through its incorporated body, Yulga Jinna Aboriginal Corporation, incorporated under the Aboriginal Councils and Associations Act 1976 on 30 April 1993.

Town planning 
Yulga JinnaLayout Plan No1. has been prepared in accordance with State Planning Policy 3.2 Aboriginal Settlements. Layout Plan No.1 was endorsed by the community on 2 April 2007 and the Western Australian Planning Commission on 13 November 2007. The Layout Plan map-set and background report can be viewed at Planning Western Australia's website.

References

External links
 Office of the Registrar of Indigenous Corporations
 Native Title Claimant application summary

Towns in Western Australia
Aboriginal communities in Mid West (Western Australia)